Lamina pyramidalis may refer to:

 Lamina pyramidalis interna
 Lamina pyramidalis externa